Lemont Refinery is an oil refinery in Romeoville, Illinois owned and operated by Citgo Petroleum Corporation.  Originally constructed in the early 1920s, it was reconstructed between 1968 and 1970 by its then owner Union Oil and has a current crude processing capacity of 177,000 barrels per day.  The refinery was the site of the 1984 Romeoville petroleum refinery disaster in which 17 people were killed.

The facility includes the following major units: one atmospheric distillation unit, one vacuum distillation unit, one fluid catalytic cracking unit, two catalytic reforming units, one alkylation unit, hydrodesulfurization units, and two coker units.

References

Energy infrastructure in Illinois
Oil refineries in the United States